Luis Costa may refer to:
Luis Costa (Spanish footballer) (born 1943), Spanish retired footballer and manager
Luís Costa (basketball) (born 1978), Angolan basketball player
Luís Costa (Portuguese footballer) (born 1998), Portuguese footballer
Luís José Costa or Leandro (1961–1998), Brazilian sertanejo musician
António Luís Costa (born 1953), Portuguese serial killer
Luis Antonio Costa (born 1953), Argentine field hockey player